Karla López (born January 28, 1977 in San Salvador, El Salvador), is a Swedish former MP for the Green Party from Gothenburg. She is the first Central American descendant to occupy a position in the Swedish Parliament.

Lopez migrated to Sweden with her parents in 1987 at the age of 10 as a political refugee during the Salvadoran Civil War and grew up in Uddevalla. She sat in parliament for the Green Party 2006–2007, where she was an alternate member of the Committee on Defence and Foreign Affairs Committee, and member of the Composite Foreign Affairs and Defence Committee from 18 October 2007.

Lopez resigned from her parliamentary seat and left the party November 13, 2007 in protest against the party according to her description was unfathomable and that she did not get any opportunity to effectively engage in politics. The former group leader of the Green Party, Mikaela Valtersson, said that Lopez was profiled against the party line.

In 2010, López started a company called Karlima that sells organic clothing.

References
 Karla López (mp) - Riksdagen (retrieved 15 June 2009).

1977 births
Living people
Women members of the Riksdag
Members of the Riksdag from the Green Party
Swedish people of Salvadoran descent
People from Uddevalla Municipality